Dilip Parulekar is an Indian Politician from the state of Goa. He is a two term member of the Goa Legislative Assembly representing the Saligao constituency. Parulekar was a Minister in the Laxmikant Parsekar led government in Goa and his portfolios included Women & Child Development, Tourism, Ports and Protocol.

Controversy 
Opposition alleged that he was involved in a Serula Land Grab Case and having fake educational qualification. The minister is allegedly involved in the Multi crore Beach Cleaning Scam. The case is currently being investigated by the Goa Lokayukta.

External links 
 Goa council of ministers

References 

Living people
People from Porvorim
Members of the Goa Legislative Assembly
Bharatiya Janata Party politicians from Goa
Year of birth missing (living people)